The Inkigayo Chart is a music program record chart that gives an award to the best-performing single of the week in South Korea. The chart measured digital performance in domestic online music services (55%), social media via YouTube views (35%), advanced viewer votes (5%), and album sales (5%) in its ranking methodology. The candidates for the number-one song of the week received additional points from live votes. Utilization of live votes was discontinued in February.

In 2017, there were 30 singles that ranked number one on the chart and 22 music acts received award trophies for this feat. Eight songs collected trophies for three weeks and earned a Triple Crown: Big Bang's "Fxxk It", Twice's "Knock Knock", "Signal", and "Likey"; IU's "Palette"; Blackpink's "As If It's Your Last"; Sunmi's "Gashina"; and BTS's "DNA".

Singer Jung Key won his first award with "Anymore" despite a lack of promotional activities on music programs. Boy group Wanna One received its first Inkigayo trophy with its debut song "Energetic". "Some" also gained music duo Bolbbalgan4 its first award on the program. "Gashina" earned Sunmi her first music show award since leaving JYP Entertainment and signing with MakeUs Entertainment. She also achieved her first Triple Crown. Prior to her official debut, Minseo took her first award win for "Yes".

Chart history

References 

2017 in South Korean music
2017 record charts
Lists of number-one songs in South Korea